Callebaut is a Belgian chocolate brand, owned by the Barry Callebaut group. It was founded in 1911 by Octaaf Callebaut in Belgium.

About

Callebaut is a Belgian coverture chocolate manufacturer. Coverture chocolate contains high amounts of cocoa butter. This chocolate is often used by gourmet and culinary professionals. Many professionals who use Callebaut coverture chocolate use it for its work ability and typical taste, which has remained consistent over the decades.

The company's core chocolate range is manufactured in Belgium from bean to chocolate according to traditional recipes. Callebaut still applies the whole-bean roasting technique, rather than just roasting cocoa kernels, as it did over 100 years ago. This technique allows preservation of all flavors and aromatic oils within the cocoa husk and fully releases them in the chocolate. In recent times, whole-bean roasting has often been seen to be a technique used by artisan, small-batch chocolate makers though Callebaut has preserved this original roasting method.

History

Chocolaterie Callebaut

‘Chocolaterie Callebaut’ was established in 1911 by Octave Callebaut in Wieze, Belgium. His chocolate company used the same factory building his grandfather Eugène Callebaut founded as a family-run brewing and milling company called ‘De Ploeg’ in 1850.

Octave Callebaut's chocolate recipes (of which the 811 and 823 recipes are still produced today) quickly found liking by numerous chocolatiers, bakers and pastry chefs. As a result, Chocolaterie Callebaut PLC was established in 1930. A clear focus towards the professional market took shape and the company from then on dedicated its activities to supplying and servicing chocolatiers, confectioners and bakeries.

Focus on couverture chocolate

After Octave Callebaut's death, his daughter Marie and his nephew Charles Callebaut took over the company in 1945. After World War II, the production of coverture chocolate became the company's core business, complemented by a limited range of bars and tablets. Callebaut now offered chocolate for artisan chocolatiers around the world and the company's W2 reference was created.

By 1965 Callebaut coverture chocolates had entered new markets across Europe and overseas, starting Callebaut's global exploration and growth.

By 1988, Callets are in production; these small drop-shaped chocolate pieces were designed to optimize the workability of chocolate. Dosing, melting and tempering work better with smaller drops than the original 5 kg (11 lb) blocks of chocolate.

In the same year Callebaut established the Callebaut College in Belgium. It is a teaching and training center for artisans and professionals who want to improve their working skills in chocolate and learn about new trends, techniques and recipes. It was the first of the current 13 Callebaut Chocolate Academies, located all over the world.

Sustainable growth

In 1996, Callebaut merged with French chocolate maker Cacao Barry to form the Barry Callebaut group. However, both chocolate brands still remain separate under the Barry Callebaut umbrella, with Callebaut as its premium couverture chocolate brand for Belgian Chocolate.

In 2002, Callebaut called the Callebaut Ambassador Club into existence to support the development of new products, packaging, recipes and professional training events. Today, the club counts 55 members worldwide, all of which are renowned chefs, pastry chefs and confectioners with an international reputation. In the same year, Callebaut, together with chocolate brands Carma and Cacao Barry, organized the World Chocolate Masters for the first time. The World Chocolate Masters were (and still are) the only international competition in the world solely dedicated to the art of chocolate. As a result of its tremendous success, the competition instantly grew into a biennial event.

In May 2012, Callebaut was Belgium's first chocolate brand to start the use sustainably grown cocoa for all of the Belgian Chocolate recipes. The launch of Callebaut's Growing Great Chocolate program was aimed at making cocoa cultivation a sustainable source of income for West African farmers and have a positive impact on farmer livelihoods. Though repeated claims have been made by Callebaut, and in particular its subsidiary Cacao Barry, to eliminate the use of child labor in its supply chain, their self-imposed deadline for accomplishing this has been repeatedly pushed back since the early 2000s and is now being slated for 2025.

Awards, decorations and certifications

Certifications

In 1990, Callebaut was the first chocolate manufacturer in the world and the first food manufacturer in Belgium to obtain the ISO-9002 certificate for its constant care for quality. Over the following years, Callebaut received a variety of other quality certificates, including:
 Retail Consortium (BRC)
 The self-checking system Federal Agency for the Safety of the Food Chain (ACS) 
 Kosher  
 Bio (EU)  
 NOP (USDA Organic)

Trivia

 Although the factory site in Wieze, Belgium already functioned as a brewery, founded in 1850 by Eugène Callebaut, it was Octaaf Callebaut who began producing chocolate bars there in 1911 and couverture chocolate in 1925.
 In 1996, Callebaut merged with rival chocolatier Cacao Barry to form a new company, formally known as Barry Callebaut, with headquarters in Zurich, Switzerland, although Callebaut retained its offices in Belgium. In 2005 Barry Callebaut was noted as "the world's biggest chocolatier."
 Callebaut was Belgium's first chocolate brand to partner up directly with cocoa farmers and cooperatives to grow cocoa beans sustainably through its Growing Great Chocolate program.
 Callebaut is the first chocolate manufacturer in the world and the first food manufacturer in Belgium to obtain the ISO-9002 certificate for its constant care for quality.

References

External links
 Callebaut

Belgian chocolate companies
Belgian brands
Companies based in East Flanders
Lebbeke